Maraveneh-ye Chahar (also Romanized as Marāvaneh-ye Chahār; also known as Al Marā‘ūneh and Marā‘ūneh) is a village in Anaqcheh Rural District, in the Central District of Ahvaz County, Khuzestan Province, Iran. At the 2006 census, its population was 86, in 18 families.

References 

Populated places in Ahvaz County